DXYZ (963 AM) Sonshine Radio is a radio station owned and operated by Sonshine Media Network International. The station's studio is located at the 4th floor, MindPro Building, La Purisima St., Zamboanga City.

History
Established on July 12, 1963, DXYZ was the first station of Nation Broadcasting Corporation under the helm of Abelardo L. Yabut, Sr. It is also  in Zamboanga City. Its offices and studios were located then in the third floor of Evangelista Building, the tallest in the city by that time. It transmitted then on a 1-kilowatt surplus transmitter from Deeco Electronics through its tower on the building rooftop.  Eddie Rodriguez, who later on became the city councilor, was the station's first manager by later part of that year.

It was known as NBC DXYZ Radyo 963 and later on Angel Radyo 963. In 1998, PLDT media subsidiary MediaQuest Holdings bought NBC from the consortium led by the Yabut family and real estate magnate Manny Villar. In 2005, The Kingdom of Jesus Christ (KJC) leader, Pastor Apollo C. Quiboloy purchased all of NBC AM radio stations, including DXYZ, and rebranded them as Sonshine Radio.

References

Radio stations in Zamboanga City
Radio stations established in 1963
Sonshine Media Network International
News and talk radio stations in the Philippines
1963 establishments in the Philippines